Eileen Georgina "Georgie" Collins (née Given; June 12, 1925 – May 3, 2017) was a Canadian film, stage, and television actress. Collins is known for her role in the 1981 cult horror film Ghostkeeper, as well as her part in Lonesome Dove: The Series (1995).

In addition to working in film and television, Collins was active in the theater community of Calgary since the 1960s. She served as the artistic director of the Pleiades Theater from 1976 until 1990.

Early life
Collins was born Eileen Georgina Given on June 12, 1925 in Calgary, Alberta, to George and Elizabeth Given. She spent her early life on a farm in rural DeBolt, Alberta.

Career
Collins made her film debut in The Visitor (1974), followed by a part in the Walt Disney two-part television film The Boy Who Talked to Badgers (1975). In 1981, she appeared in a pivotal role in the horror film Ghostkeeper. She would later appear in Gunsmoke: Return to Dodge (1987), and the comedy Housekeeping (1988), opposite Christine Lahti. She also had a minor part in the television film Body of Evidence opposite Margot Kidder, which was filmed in Calgary.

She had supporting parts in the Mary-Kate and Ashley Olsen film How the West Was Fun (1994). She appeared in a six-episode arc of Lonesome Dove: The Series between 1994 and 1995. In 2005, she appeared in a guest role on the Steven Spielberg-produced series Into the West.

In addition to her work in film and television, Collins had been an active member of the Calgary theater community for multiple decades. She served as the artistic director of the Pleiades Theatre from 1976 until 1990. Now the Vertigo Mystery Theatre, it is the only professional theatre company in Canada that produces a full season of mystery plays.

In 2003, Collins was honored by the Alliance of Canadian Cinema, Television and Radio Artists for being a founding member of ACTRA Calgary.

Personal life
Collins was married to Allen Collins in 1943. The couple had two children, Allen and Debi.

She died on May 3, 2017 at the age of 91.

Filmography

References

External links
 
 

1925 births
2017 deaths
Canadian film actresses
Canadian stage actresses
Canadian television actresses
Actresses from Calgary
20th-century Canadian actresses
21st-century Canadian actresses